Civilization, and Its Part in My Downfall is a novel by Canadian writer Paul Quarrington, published in 1994 by Random House Canada.

Set during the early days of the film industry in Hollywood, the novel centres on Thom Moss, a onetime silent film star who is now in prison and is writing his personal account of his rise and fall. Characters who play a role in his story include J.D.D. Jensen, a Western fiction author who first introduces him to the film industry; Caspar Willison, a D. W. Griffith-like film director who first makes Moss a star but ultimately destroys him by refusing to give him a role in the planned epic film Civilization; Jefferson Foote, Willison's one-armed screenwriter and Moss's best friend in the industry; and Thespa Doone, Moss's frequent costar and love interest.

Although favourably reviewed by critics, the novel sold poorly, which pushed Quarrington to concentrate more actively on film and television writing.

References

1994 Canadian novels
Novels by Paul Quarrington
Hollywood novels